Bojnik Airport ( / Aerodrom Bojnik), also known as Kosančić Airport ( / Aerodrom Kosančić), was a military airport in the village of Kosančić, near the village of Bojnik, about 22 km southeasterly from the center city of Leskovac. The airport area comprises 0.42 km2, including some barracks. This airport was used in air battles in the April War at beginning of World War II. It is sold and became defunct in 2012.

See also
Đavolja Varoš
Justiniana Prima

References

External links
 Poleće biznis sa vojne piste
 KAMIKAZE u Aprilskom ratu 1941.godine

Defunct airports
Airports in Serbia